Karlonisi is an island of the Echinades (Drakoneres subgroup), among the Ionian Islands group of Greece. , it had no resident population.

References

Echinades
Islands of the Ionian Islands (region)
Landforms of Ithaca
Islands of Greece